Mythomaniac is a 2019 French-language television series created by Anne Berest and Fabrice Gobert and starring Marina Hands, Mathieu Demy and Marie Drion.

Cast 
 Marina Hands as Elvira
 Mathieu Demy as Patrick
 Marie Drion as Carole
 Jérémy Gillet as Sam
 Zelie Rixhon as Virginie
 Yves Jacques as Mr. Brunet
 Jean-Charles Clichet as Jeff
 Julia Faure as Isa
 Andrea Roncato as Nonno
 Linh Dan Pham as Brigitte
 Fadily Camara
 Françoise Lebrun
 Marceau Ebersolt as Niklas
 Catherine Mouchet
 Loubna Abidar as Karima
 Amélie Prevot as Hotesse d'accueil hopital
 Daniel Semporé as Henry

Release 
Mythomaniac was released on October 3, 2019 on Arte.

References

External links
 
 

French-language Netflix original programming
2019 French television series debuts